The Little Cannon River is a small,  river in Minnesota, United States. It is located in its entirety in Le Sueur County. It joins the Cannon River in Sabre Lake.

See also
List of rivers of Minnesota

References

Minnesota Watersheds
USGS Hydrologic Unit Map - State of Minnesota (1974)

Rivers of Minnesota
Rivers of Le Sueur County, Minnesota